Quarrington may refer to:

People
 Joel Quarrington, Canadian double bassist (born 1955)
 Paul Quarrington, Canadian novelist (born 1953)

Places
 Cassop-cum-Quarrington, County Durham, England
 Old Quarrington, County Durham, England
 Quarrington Hill, County Durham, England
 Quarrington, Lincolnshire, England

See also
 Quarrendon (disambiguation)